Obediah Layton (July 10, 1911 – October 13, 1997) was an American Negro league pitcher in the 1930s.

A native of Birmingham, Alabama, Layton played for the Hilldale Club in 1931. He died in Detroit, Michigan in 1997 at age 86.

References

External links
Baseball statistics and player information from Baseball-Reference Black Baseball Stats and Seamheads

1911 births
1997 deaths
Hilldale Club players
Baseball pitchers
Baseball players from Birmingham, Alabama
20th-century African-American sportspeople